Timothee Yap Jin Wei (born 5 November 1994) is a Singaporean sprinter. He has represented Singapore at several major international competitions across the various age categories and at the senior level. He competed at the 2016 Summer Olympics in the men's 100 metres race; his time of 10.79 seconds in the second round did not qualify him for the semifinals.

Athletics
Yap took part in the Summer Olympics at the Rio 2016 where he participated in the 100m sprint. In the preliminaries, he clocked a time of 10.84s and finished second in Heat 3. He then qualified for Round 1 in heat 7 where he raced with Usain Bolt. He was ranked 9th with a time of 10.79s, which was faster than the preliminaries.

Showbiz career
In September 2016, NoonTalk Media and Yap completed a contract.

Yap debuted in the Mediacorp Toggle's web series 2589 Days Apart, together with Felicia Chin as the female lead.

Personal life 
Yap is a graduate of the National University of Singapore with a Bachelor of Laws (Honours) (LL.B.).

Filmography

References

External links
 
 Timothee Yap at NoonTalk Media

1994 births
Living people
Singaporean male sprinters
Olympic athletes of Singapore
Athletes (track and field) at the 2016 Summer Olympics